Angelina Sandoval-Gutierrez (born February 28, 1938) is a Filipino jurist who served as an associate justice of the Supreme Court of the Philippines from 2000 to 2008. She was the last appointment to the Court made by President Joseph Estrada.

Profile
Sandoval-Gutierrez earned her law degree from the University of Santo Tomas in 1960. After two years working at the National Bureau of Investigation, Sandoval-Gutierrez joined the Department of Justice in 1965. She later worked as an attorney for the Supreme Court.

In 1983, Sandoval-Gutierrez was appointed as a trial court judge in Manila. She was promoted as an associate justice of the Court of Appeals by President Corazon Aquino in 1991. She served in the appellate court until her appointment to the Supreme Court in 2000.

In pursuit of post-graduate studies attended Harvard Law School Courses in 1989 and 1994, taking up Constitutional Law, Advanced Constitutional Law, Legal Medicine, Family Law and Federal Courts. She also studied, as a fellow, American and International Law at the Academy of the American and International Law, University of Texas in Dallas. She attended the course on trial techniques at the National Judicial College, University of Nevada at Reno and took up management and delinquency control at the University of Southern California Delinquency Control Institute, Los Angeles.

Among many various honors, Sandoval-Gutierrez was the first recipient of the prestigious Cayetano Arellano Award as an Outstanding RTC Judge of the Philippines for 1990. She has also the distinction of being the first winner (First Prize Awardee, 1989) in the judicial essay/best written decision contest among Regional Trial Court women judges sponsored by the Philippine Women Judges Association yearly for having written the best “Proposed Innovations in Judicial Management and Procedure.”

From 2007 up to present, Sandoval-Gutierrez has served as the Dean of the Graduate School of Law of the Pamantasan ng Lungsod ng Maynila.

Family

Sandoval-Gutierrez was married to the late National Bureau of Investigation Assistant Director Diego H. Gutierrez, who died in 2002. They have three children: Aileen Marie is the City Prosecutor of Muntinlupa whose husband, Robert Victor C. Marcon, is the Presiding Judge of the Regional Trial Court, Branch 54, Lucena City; Francis Joseph, an Esquire (attorney-at-law), is a graduate of American University Washington College of Law. He works in the Federal Communications Commission, Washington, D.C.; James Gerard, also an Esquire, is a graduate of Boston University School of Law who lives and practices in New York City.

On May 14, 2000, Sandoval-Gutierrez was bestowed the “Ulirang Ina Award” by the National Mother's Day and Father's Day Foundation.

Sandoval-Gutierrez' heritage and landmark Angelina Sandoval-Gutierrez Ancestral House, Museum and Memorabilia is located at her home town of Barangay Concepcion, Alitagtag, Batangas.

Some notable opinions 
 Estrada v. Desierto (2001) - Separate Opinion — on the validity of assumption to the presidency of Gloria Macapagal Arroyo
 Long v. Basa (2001) — on availability of judicial remedies following expulsion of board members in a religious corporation
 Prov. of Camarines Sur v. Prov. of Quezon (2001)  — on boundary dispute between Camarines Sur and Quezon
 Chavez v. Romulo (2004)  — on the right to bear arms in the Philippines
 Batangas CATV v. Court of Appeals (2004) — on right of municipal governments to regulate cable TV subscription rates
 MTRCB v. ABS-CBN (2005) — on whether a public affairs television program may be subjected to prior review by the government television review board
 Republic v. Lim (2005) — on enforcement of just compensation in eminent domain
 David v. Ermita (2006) - on constitutionality of declaration of February 2006 declaration of state of emergency
 Sabio v. Gordon (2006) — on immunity of PCGG officials from attendance in congressional hearings

References

External links 

 Justice Angelina Sandoval-Gutierrez (Official Supreme Court Webpage)

Associate Justices of the Supreme Court of the Philippines
1938 births
Living people
People from Batangas
20th-century Filipino judges
21st-century Filipino lawyers
Harvard Law School alumni
University of Santo Tomas alumni
Filipino women judges
20th-century women judges
21st-century women judges